is a Japanese voice actress from Hiroshima Prefecture, Japan. She is affiliated with Sigma Seven.

Biography
Ōgame stated that she became a voice actress when she saw the stage where the voice actors appeared, felt fresh and attractive, and knew the diversity of the profession of voice actors. She passed the 2nd Sigma Seven public audition held in 2007 while attending Sogo Gakuen Human Academy (Asuka Nishi, Mai Fuchigami and Atsushi Tamaru) and made her debut in 2009. She played the role of Mayshen Trinden in her debut work, Chrome Shelled Regios. A debut support project titled "Ganbare Mayshen" was held on a related site.

Ōgame mainly voices female characters. In 2009, she played the role of Maki Hoshikawa as the main heroine of the video game Tokimeki Memorial 4.

She also actively engages in music activities, such as singing an opening theme under the name of Erio Tōwa in Ground Control to Psychoelectric Girl and singing the theme song for "Tansu Mobile Phone Atsume Thai ＼ (^ o ^) ／", sponsored by the Ministry of Economy, Trade and Industry.

Since October 2014, she has also been active as a professional member of the Japan Professional Mahjong Association. She left the organization on April 2022. 

On March 21, 2020, Ōgame confirmed that she is married to Nobuhiko Okamoto after Shūkan Bunshun reported he had an extramarital affair with an unnamed woman.

Filmography

Television animation

2009
Chrome Shelled Regios - Mayshen Torinden
Heaven's Lost Property - Daedalus

2010
Chu-Bra!! - Akemi; Shimada
Hanamaru Kindergarten - Daigo; Maika
Kiss×sis - Mikazuki Kiryū
Omamori Himari - Lizlet L. Chelsie
Heaven's Lost Property ~Forte~ - Daedalus

2011
Denpa Onna to Seishun Otoko - Erio Tōwa
Rio: Rainbow Gate! - Yang-Yang
Ro-Kyu-Bu! - Satsuki Kakizono

2012
Kono Naka ni Hitori, Imōto ga Iru! - Mana Tendō
Kokoro Connect - Rina Yaegashi
Medaka Box - Aria Ariake
Saki Achiga-hen episode of Side-A - Himeko Tsuruta

2013
Vividred Operation - Momo Isshiki
Photo Kano - Rina Yunoki

2014
Dragonar Academy - Lukka Saarinen

2015
Kōfuku Graffiti - Kirin Morino

2016
Girls Beyond the Wasteland - Class representative

Original video animation
2010
Tokimeki Memorial 4 Original Animation: Hajimari no Finder - Maki Hoshikawa

2011
Baby Princess 3D Paradise 0 - Asahi Amatsuka

2012
Moe Can Change! - Sarari
A Town Where You Live - Student

2013
OVA no Naka ni Hitori, Imōto ga Iru! - Mana Tendō

Video games
2009
Tokimeki Memorial 4 - Maki Hoshikawa

2010
Abyss of the Sacrifice - Jitka

2011
Dead End: Orchestral Manoeuvres in the Dead End - Grete
Yome Collection - Erio Tōwa

2012
Atelier Ayesha ~Tasogare no Daichi no Renkinjutsushi~ - Nanaca Grunden

2014
Dengeki Bunko: Fighting Climax - Erio Tōwa
Granblue Fantasy - Sara

2016
Girls Beyond the Wasteland - Class representative

2017
School Girl/Zombie Hunter - Sayuri Akiba

References

External links
 Official blog 
 Official agency profile 
 

1987 births
Living people
Japanese video game actresses
Japanese voice actresses
Sigma Seven voice actors
Voice actresses from Hiroshima Prefecture